This article lists the presidents of the Assembly of North Macedonia, from the establishment of ASNOM in 1944 to the present day.

List of presidents (1944–present)

Presidents of the People's Assembly of the Socialist Republic of Macedonia (1944–1991)
 Party

 
 Status

Presidents of the Assembly of the Republic of Macedonia / North Macedonia (from 1991)
 Parties

 
 
 
 
 
 

 Status

Footnotes

See also
President of North Macedonia
Prime Minister of North Macedonia

External links
Official website of the Assembly of the Republic of Macedonia

Politics of North Macedonia
Macedonia
North Macedonia politics-related lists